Catherine Murray  may refer to:
Catherine Murray, child witness to apparition at Knock
Catherine Murray, Countess of Dunmore (1814–1886), British peeress
Catherine Murray di Montezemolo (1925–2009), fashion editor
Kathryn Murray, wife of Arthur Murray
Katharine Isabelle, Katherine Isobel Murray, actress
Katherine Marjory Stewart Murray, Duchess of Atholl
Catherine Murray, Lady Abercairny, Scottish aristocrat
Catherine Murray, Countess of Dysart, Scottish noblewoman

See also
Kate Murray, supervisor of Hempstead, New York
Murray (surname)